Ludwig Johann Wilhelm Gruno Erbprinz von Hessen-Homburg (15 January 1705 – 23 October 1745) was hereditary prince of Hesse-Homburg, member of the House of Hesse and an Imperial Russian field marshal.

Early life 
He was the eldest surviving son of Frederick III, Landgrave of Hesse-Homburg and his wife Princess Elisabeth Dorothea of Hesse-Darmstadt (1676–1721), daughter of Louis VI, Landgrave of Hesse-Darmstadt.

Biography 
He studied at the University of Giessen and was sent by his father to Russia in 1723. He became Major-General in Riga and commander of the Narva-Regiment. As the grandson of Princess Louise Elisabeth of Courland, he hoped in vain to succeed his cousin Ferdinand Kettler as Duke of Courland. Anna of Russia moved him to Saint Petersburg, where he was promoted to General-Lieutenant and commander of the Saint Petersburg garrison.

In 1732, he led a successful campaign against the Crimean Tatars in the Caucasus. After operations in Eastern Poland in  1734-1735, he again fought against the Crimean Tatars and the Turks in 1736-1737, but now under command of Count Burkhard Christoph von Münnich. He was awarded with the rank of General-Feldzeugmeister and was appointed Governor of Astrachan and the Persian provinces.

Ludwig Gruno also had good relations with the new Empress Elizabeth of Russia. She gave him in 1742 the title of General-Fieldmarshal, a house in Moscow and an estate in Livonia.

He died from illness on a travel in Berlin. He pre-deceased his father and was buried in the crypt of Bad Homburg Castle.

Family 

Ludwig Gruno of Hesse-Homburg married Princess Anastasija Trubetskaya, widowed Princess Cantemir, on 3 February 1738. 
By birth she was member of House of Trubetskoy as a daughter of Prince Ivan Trubetskoy, cousin of Prince Nikita Trubetskoy. She was widow of Dimitrie Cantemir, Prince of Moldavia.
They had no children.

Sources 
 Deutsche Biographie

1705 births
1745 deaths
Field marshals of Russia
Ludwig Gruno
18th-century military personnel from the Russian Empire
18th-century German people
Heirs apparent who never acceded
Sons of monarchs